Eliphaz ( "My Elohim is gold", Standard Hebrew Elifaz, Tiberian Hebrew ʾĔlîp̄az / ʾĔlîp̄āz) was the first-born son  of Esau and his wife Adah. He had six sons, of whom Omar was the firstborn, and the others were Teman, Zepho, Gatam, Kenaz and finally Amalek, who was born to his concubine Timna. The people of Amalek were the ancestral enemy of the Israelite people (Book of Exodus  ; Book of Deuteronomy ). 

The Midrash relates that when Jacob escaped from Esau and fled to his uncle Laban in Haran, Esau sent Eliphaz to pursue and kill Jacob, his uncle, who was his Rabbi also. When they met, Jacob implored Eliphaz not to kill him, but Eliphaz challenged that he had his father's instructions to fulfill. Jacob gave everything he had with him to Eliphaz and said, ”Take what I have, for a poor man is counted as dead." Eliphaz was satisfied and left his uncle and rabbi poor, but still alive: (Rashi to the Book of Genesis )

According to Louis Ginzburg's Legends of the Jews, Eliphaz was a prophet.

See also
Obadiah

References 

Books of Chronicles people
Torah people
Esau